Óscar Maia Vasques de Carvalho (born 22 December 1903, date of death unknown) was a Portuguese footballer who played for Boavista and Leixões, as a defender.

International career 
Although Carvalho never played a single game for the national team, he was called for the 1928 Football Olympic Tournament whilst playing for Boavista.

References 

1903 births
Boavista F.C. players
Leixões S.C. players
Portuguese footballers
Primeira Liga players
Olympic footballers of Portugal
Footballers at the 1928 Summer Olympics
Year of death missing
Footballers from Porto
Association football defenders